The African records in swimming are the fastest times ever by a swimmer representing an African country. These records are ratified by CANA, the African Swimming Confederation (its acronym derives from its name in French: Confédération Africaine Natation).

All records were set in finals unless noted otherwise.

Long Course (50 m)

Men

Women

Mixed relay

Short Course (25 m)

Men

Women

Mixed relay

Record holders' rankings

By nation

References

External links
C.A.N.A. official website

Africa
Records
Swimming records
Swimming